Arul M. Chinnaiyan is a Hicks Endowed Professor of Pathology and professor of pathology and urology at the University of Michigan Medical School. He is also a Howard Hughes medical Investigator (HHMI) at the Howard Hughes Medical Institute.
 
Arul Chinnaiyan received both PhD and MD degrees at the University of Michigan Medical School in 1999. He is a cancer researcher and the recipient of the 28th annual American Association for Cancer Research Award for Outstanding Achievement in Cancer Research at the annual meeting of the AACR in April 2008 in San Diego. He was also the leader of a group of scientists who received the inaugural 2007 American Association for Cancer Research "Team Science" Award for their discovery of gene fusions in prostate cancer.

Arul Chinnaiyan received a number of other awards and prizes, including the Burroughs Wellcome Fund Clinical Scientist Award in Translational Research and of the Ramzi Cotran Young Investigator Award from the United States and Canadian Academy of Pathology.   He is an elected member of the American Society for Clinical Investigation.

He is a member of the Editorial Board for Oncogene.

Research and discovery 
The focus of his research is molecular profiling of cancer to discover novel diagnostic markers and therapeutic targets. It is generally believed that blood cancers are caused by chromosome translocation such as Bcr-Abl in chronic myelogenous leukaemia (CML), whereas solid tumors are caused by mutations in growth or tumour suppressor genes. In research which challenges the current dogma, Arul has discovered chromosome translocation in solid prostate tumours. Arul has discovered that this translocation occurs between a male hormone related gene TMPRSS2 and transcription factors of the Erythroblast transformation specific (ETS) family.

Publications
Partial list:

References 

Year of birth missing (living people)
Living people
American people of Indian descent in health professions
University of Michigan faculty
University of Michigan Medical School alumni
Place of birth missing (living people)
Howard Hughes Medical Investigators
Members of the National Academy of Medicine
Members of the United States National Academy of Sciences